A crossfire is a military term for the siting of weapons so that their arcs of fire overlap.

Crossfire may also refer to:

Comics and manga 
Crossfire (Eclipse Comics), a ero in the DNAgents universe
Crossfire (comics), a supervillain in the Marvel Comics fictional Marvel Universe
Crossfire (Batman: Gotham Knight)
Crossfire (manga), a series by Kouta Hirano

Film 
Crossfire (film), 1947 film noir starring Robert Mitchum
Cross Fire (film), a 1933 Western film

Gaming 
Crossfire (board game), a board game created by the Milton Bradley Company in 1971
Crossfire (miniatures game), a tabletop wargaming system (1996)
Crossfire (1981 video game), a 1981 video game created by Jay Sullivan
Super Airwolf (1991 video game), localized in the US as Cross Fire
Crossfire (1992 video game), an open source multiplayer online computer role-playing game developed in 1992
Crossfire (series), a video game series created by Smilegate
Crossfire (2007 video game), an online multiplayer first-person shooter game first released in 2007
Mobile Suit Gundam: Crossfire, a PlayStation 3 launch title
Sid Meier's Alien Crossfire, an expansion pack for Sid Meier's Alpha Centauri
Crossfire (card game)

Literature 
Crossfire (novel), a 1998 novel by Miyuki Miyabe
Crossfire (2007 novel), a novel by ex-SAS soldier Andy McNab
Cross Fire (novel), a novel by James Patterson
Crossfire, the fifth book in the Noughts & Crosses novel series by Malorie Blackman
Crossfire, a series of novels by Sylvia Day
Crossfire: The Plot that Killed Kennedy, a 1989 work by Jim Marrs

Music

Albums
Cross Fire (album), 1997 album from James Blood Ulmer's Music Revelation Ensemble
Cross Fire (Spinners album), 1984 album from American soul vocal group The Spinners

Bands
Crossfire (band), an Australian jazz fusion ensemble
CrossFire (folk band), a French folk rock and blues duo
The Crossfires, a surf instrumental band that later became The Turtles

Songs
"Crossfire" (Brandon Flowers song), 2010
“Crossfire”, a song by 311 from Voyager, 2019
"Crossfire", a song by The Bellamy Brothers, 1977
"Crossfire", a song by Die Krupps from II - The Final Option, 1993
"Crossfire", a song by Jethro Tull from A, 1980
"Crossfire", a song by Scorpions from Love at First Sting, 1984
“Crossfire”, a song by Stephen from Sincerely, 2015
"Crossfire", a song by Stevie Ray Vaughan from In Step, 1989

Television 
Crossfire (Canadian TV program), a 1955 Canadian current affairs television program that aired on CBC
Crossfire (American TV program, a 1982-2005 and 2013-2014 nightly American current events debate television program that aired on CNN.
Crossfire (British TV programme), a 1984–2004 UK current affairs programme that aired on Grampian Television (STV)
Crossfire (British TV series), a 2022 UK thriller, written by Louise Doughty
"Crossfire" (Castle), the final episode of Castle
"Crossfire" (Homeland), an episode from the first season of Showtime series Homeland
"Crossfire" (Smallville episode), from the ninth season of the TV series
"Crossfire" (Star Trek: Deep Space Nine), an episode from the fourth season of the television series Star Trek: Deep Space Nine
"Crossfire" (Supergirl), a season 2 episode of the TV series
XFire (TV series), a UK reality/TV game show (pronounced Crossfire)

Other uses 
AMD CrossFire, AMD's method for connecting video cards
Chrysler Crossfire, an automobile, model years 2004-2008
Crossfire (G.I. Joe), a radio-controlled G.I. Joe vehicle
Public forum debate, also known as crossfire debate
cross-fire, a method of locomotion for an animal
Crossfire (Bangladesh), extrajudicial killings by law enforcement agencies in Bangladesh
CrossFire, a cross-platform crossword puzzle construction software by Beekeeper Labs
Washington Crossfire, an amateur soccer team based near Seattle, Washington, U.S.

See also
 Xfire (disambiguation)